Shiva Recoil: Live/Unlive is a live performance album by Paul Schütze and Phantom City, released in 1997 through Virgin Records. Shiva Recoil is a companion to Shütze'sSite Anubis (1996), a studio-only album featuring most of the same musicians.

Track listing

Personnel 
Musicians
Raoul Björkenheim – guitar
Alex Buess – bass clarinet, engineering, mixing
Toshinori Kondo – trumpet
Bill Laswell – bass guitar
Paul Schütze – keyboards, tape, production, illustration, photography
Dirk Wachtelaer – drums
Production and additional personnel
Anne-Louise Falsone – illustration
Maarit Kytöharju – photography
Simon Heyworth – mastering
Andrew Hulme – mixing
Antti Sjöholm – recording
Piikki Vainionpaa – mixing
Tage Ylitalo – engineering

References 

1997 live albums
Paul Schütze albums
Virgin Records albums
Albums produced by Paul Schütze